KBAQ (89.5 FM, "K Bach") is a Phoenix metro area FM radio station that plays classical music twenty-four hours per day. It is co-owned by the Maricopa County Community College District and Arizona State University. A member of National Public Radio, its main transmitter was moved from the White Tank Mountains to South Mountain Park in 2006. An additional Translator is located on 89.7 and a live Internet audio stream is available. It is also simulcast on local PBS station KAET (owned by ASU) on digital channel 8.5, where it broadcasts in Dolby Digital 5.1 surround sound. The main office and studio complex is located in Tempe (east suburban Phoenix) at the flagship location of Rio Salado College.

KBAQ's slogan is "Your classical companion". The station's nickname is a play on the name of composer Johann Sebastian Bach.

KBAQ is a sister to the area's flagship NPR station, KJZZ.

History
Phoenix's classical station of record had been KONC at 101.5 MHz. On March 31, 1986, that station left the classical format. Late in 1986, another commercial radio station stepped into the format, a new station at 106.3 adopting the KONC calls; Tucson's KUAT-FM also established a translator in Phoenix.

Maricopa County Community College District launched a bid for a non-commercial classical music station at 89.5 FM. However, a week later, ASU put in a bid for 89.5 as well. The move angered MCCCD officials; not only did ASU propose to use taxpayer money, but it forced MCCCD into comparative hearings. KJZZ's station director said, "If ASU had desired to do something to impede the progress in returning classical music to the airwaves in Phoenix, it couldn't have found a better action to pursue." MCCCD had already raised some $80,000 to build a classical station, but halted its fundraising drive when ASU entered the fray. In addition, the owner of the former KONC at 101.5 donated the station's music library to KJZZ.

In 1988, the two classical applications were designated for a consolidated hearing alongside those of Sun Health Corporation, Western Broadcasting Corporation, and Radio Alliance Phoenix. Over the course of 1989, Western and Radio Alliance Phoenix withdrew. On June 26, 1990, the FCC denied the Sun Health application in favor of the MCCCD and ASU bids. The FCC ordered MCCCD and ASU to share time on the 89.5 frequency and stipulating a time-share plan in the event the two parties could not agree. The two sides came to an agreement in which they would jointly own the station. KBAQ began broadcasting from atop South Mountain at the end of April 1993 with an effective radiated power of just 91 watts, effectively limiting its coverage to Phoenix itself and its innermost suburbs.

In 1997, KBAQ was relocated to the White Tank Mountains north and west of Phoenix, which permitted a power increase to 12,500 watts. In 2009, KBAQ was approved to return to South Mountain with an ERP of 30,000 watts.

Programs
The broadcast schedule consists primarily of playlists announced by local hosts, as well as the nationally-syndicated program Sunday Baroque. KBAQ also features programs from Central Sound at PBS, formerly the KBAQ Production Studio; these include programs of Arizona Opera and the Phoenix Symphony during their seasons; ASU in Concert (a program of performances from the ASU Herberger Institute School of Music); Southwest Season Ticket (featuring performances from various venues in the Phoenix area and statewide) and the Mozart Buffet (featuring music of Wolfgang Amadeus Mozart and his contemporaries).

HD Radio
KBAQ's HD Radio signal is multiplexed.
 HD1 is a simulcast of KBAQ's classical programming.
 HD2 carries Radio Bilingüe, a mix of classical and contemporary music, arts and cultural programming and news for Spanish speaking listeners.
 HD3 carries Sun Sounds of Arizona, a reading and information access service for people who cannot read print because of a disability.

Translators

References

External links 
 KBAQ-FM official website
 Central Sound at Arizona PBS, originally established as the KBAQ Production Studio

 Coverage maps

BAQ
Classical music radio stations in the United States
Maricopa County Community College District
Arizona State University
NPR member stations
Radio stations established in 1992